The Shipwrecked is a 1994 Chilean drama film directed by Miguel Littín. It was screened in the Un Certain Regard section at the 1994 Cannes Film Festival.

Plot 
Aron is an exiled Chilean whose father has died during his years of absence, and whose brother is one of the thousands of 'disappeared'. Aron, back in his country, feels like a castaway lost in a place he doesn't recognize, trying to understand what happened to his family and to the country he once knew.

Cast
 Luis Alarcón as Sebastian Mola
 Bastián Bodenhöfer as Ur
 Tennyson Ferrada as Rene
 Benjamin Littin
 Marcelo Romo as Aron
 Valentina Vargas as Isol

References

External links

1994 films
1994 drama films
Chilean drama films
1990s Spanish-language films
Films directed by Miguel Littín